Killarney-Turtle Mountain is a rural municipality (RM) located in the Westman Region of Manitoba, Canada.  It is located to the immediate north of the Canada–United States border opposite Rollete and Towner Counties, North Dakota.

History

The RM was formed on January 1, 2007 through the amalgamation of the Rural Municipality of Turtle Mountain and the Town of Killarney.

Communities 
Bannerman
Enterprise
Holmfield
Killarney
Lena
Ninga
Rhodes
Wakopa

Demographics 

In the 2011 Census, the Municipality of Killarney-Turtle Mountain had a population of 3,233 living in 1,347 of its 1,589 total dwellings, a -2.0% change from its 2006 population of 3,299.

See also
 St. John–Lena Border Crossing

References

External links 

 
Killarney-Turtle Mountain